Ken Spence (21 November 1929 – 29 January 1989) was a Scottish international rugby union player. He played as a Scrum-half.

Rugby union career

Amateur career

Spence played for London Scottish.

In 1949, during a heatwave, in a London Scottish match against West of Scotland, Spence made the newspapers by having to be taken to hospital with sunstroke. He had a temperature of 103 degrees.

He also played for Oxford University.

Provincial career

He represented North of Scotland. He played for North against South Africa in 1951.

He captained the Rest of Scotland Scotland Possibles side in an international trial match in 1952.

International career

He was capped for  once in 1953. He played in the Five Nations match against Ireland at Murrayfield Stadium on 28 February.

References

1929 births
1989 deaths
People educated at Loretto School, Musselburgh
Scottish rugby union players
Scotland international rugby union players
Oxford University RFC players
North of Scotland (combined side) players
London Scottish F.C. players
Scotland Possibles players
Rugby union scrum-halves